Tamakasuga Ryōji (born January 7, 1972 as Ryōji Matsumoto) is a former sumo wrestler from Seiyo, Ehime Prefecture, Japan. A former amateur sumo champion, he made his professional debut in 1994 and reached a highest rank of sekiwake in 1997. He fought in the top makuuchi division for twelve years, won five special prizes and earned seven gold stars for defeating yokozuna. He retired in 2008 and is now a sumo coach. In February 2010 he took over the running of Kataonami stable.

Career
He entered professional sumo in January 1994, after having practiced sumo at Chuo University. He joined Kataonami stable, adopting the shikona (fighting name) of Tamakasuga ("Tama", meaning "jewel", being a common prefix at his stable). Because of his achievements in amateur sumo he was allowed to enter at the bottom of the third makushita division, skipping the lower divisions. After steady but unspectacular progress he reached the jūryō division in March 1995 and was promoted to the top division five tournaments after that, in January 1996. He scored ten wins in his top division debut and was awarded the Fighting Spirit prize.

Tamakasuga had a long career in the top makuuchi division of sumo, earning seven gold stars for defeating yokozuna. He upset yokozuna Akebono, Wakanohana and Takanohana in three successive tournaments from September 1998 to January 1999. The highest rank he achieved was sekiwake, but he never achieved a kachi-koshi win–loss ratio as a san'yaku wrestler, managing only a 7–8 score in his sekiwake debut, and then a 6–9 as komusubi in the next tournament. Subsequently, he spent his career either as a rank and file maegashira, or fighting his way back into the top division, as he was demoted to jūryō a number of times.

Tamakasuga made something of a comeback in 2006, and was awarded the Technique Prize in July of that year, following his 11–4 performance which gave him his best ever top division score and a share of third place. His previous special prize, for Outstanding Performance, was in May 1997, 55 tournaments earlier. This is the longest ever gap between awards. He was promoted all the way up to maegashira 4 in September 2007, fighting the top rankers for the first time in several years. He remained in makuuchi until July 2008, where he was the oldest man in the top division, but could only manage three wins in that tournament and withdrew on the final day, citing a neck injury.

Fighting style
Tamakasuga was a solidly oshi-sumo wrestler, relying on pushes to the opponent's chest as opposed to grabbing the mawashi. His most popular winning technique was oshi-dashi, a simple push-out. He also frequently employed pull-down moves such as hataki-komi and hiki-otoshi.

Retirement from sumo

He announced his retirement in September 2008, at the age of 36, after posting a losing record in that tournament. He remained in the sumo world as a coach at Kataonami stable, under the toshiyori (elder) name Tateyama-oyakata. His danpatsu-shiki, or official retirement ceremony, was held at the Ryōgoku Kokugikan on 30 May 2009. In February 2010 he swapped elder names with his old head coach (former sekiwake Tamanofuji) and took charge of the stable.

Tamakasuga has an asteroid named after him. Known as 8432 Tamakasuga, it was named by astronomers at an observatory in his home prefecture.

Career record

See also
Glossary of sumo terms
List of sumo tournament second division champions
List of past sumo wrestlers
List of sumo elders
List of sekiwake

References

External links

1972 births
Living people
Japanese sumo wrestlers
People from Seiyo, Ehime
Sumo people from Ehime Prefecture
Chuo University alumni
Sekiwake